The Huguenot Fort is a historic fortification site on Fort Hill Road in Oxford, Massachusetts.

History
The original fort was built in 1694 by Huguenots, Protestant immigrants who were fleeing state church persecution in France.  Oxford was originally settled by Huguenots in two waves, the original settlement having been abandoned after four residents (John Johnson and his three children, Peter, Andrew and Mary) were killed in a violent confrontation with local Native Americans. This event, the Johnson Massacre, is commemorated near the center of town. The remains of the Huguenots' Fort (built in 1686–1694) to protect from Indian attack still exist off of Huguenot Road commemorated by a nineteenth-century monument. The site was added to the National Register of Historic Places in 1988.

See also
National Register of Historic Places listings in Worcester County, Massachusetts

References

External links

Buildings and structures completed in 1694
Huguenot history in the United States
Forts on the National Register of Historic Places in Massachusetts
Buildings and structures in Worcester County, Massachusetts
Forts in Massachusetts
Colonial forts in Massachusetts
1694 establishments in Massachusetts
Oxford, Massachusetts
National Register of Historic Places in Worcester County, Massachusetts